Semyon Mikhailovich Lobov (15 February 1913 – 12 July 1977) was a Fleet Admiral in the Soviet Navy.

Lobov was born in Smolnikovo, Volokolamsky District, Moscow Oblast and joined the Soviet Navy in 1932. In 1937 Lobov completed the M.V. Frunze Military Academy and served in the Soviet Pacific Fleet. Between 1938 and 1946 he commanded an escort ship and a destroyer. In 1945 he took part in the Soviet war against Japan.

In 1946 Lobov transferred to the Black Sea Fleet where he commanded the Kirov-class cruiser Voroshilov. In 1951 he commanded the battleship Sevastopol. In 1954 Lobov transferred to the Soviet Northern Fleet where he became a squadron commander and in 1964 he became Commander of the Northern Fleet.

In 1972 Lobov was deputy chief of staff of the Soviet Navy and became a candidate member of the Central Committee of the Communist Party. He was also a deputy in the Supreme Soviet.

Lobov is buried in the Novodevichy Cemetery in Moscow.

The fourth, incomplete and uncommissioned, Slava-class cruiser Admiral Flota Lobov was named after him.

Awards and decorations
Order of Lenin - twice
Order of the October Revolution
Order of the Red Banner - twice
Order of the Red Star - twice

References
Советская военная энциклопедия в 8-и томах. М,:Военное издательство, 1976—1981. — Т. 5. — С.15-16.
page in Russian

1913 births
1977 deaths
People from Volokolamsky District
People from Klinsky Uyezd
Central Committee of the Communist Party of the Soviet Union candidate members
Seventh convocation members of the Supreme Soviet of the Soviet Union
Eighth convocation members of the Supreme Soviet of the Soviet Union
Soviet admirals
Soviet Navy personnel
Soviet military personnel of World War II
Recipients of the Order of Lenin
Recipients of the Order of the Red Banner
Recipients of the Order of the Red Star
Burials at Novodevichy Cemetery